Abu Zaid Abd al-Rahman Abu Muhammad Ibn Abd al-Qadir al-Fasi (c. 1631–1685) was a Moroccan writer in the field of law, history, astronomy and music. He wrote some 170 books and has been called the Suyuti of his time. He was born in the prominent family of al-Fasi and he was a follower of his father, the Sufi saint Abd al-Qadir Ibn Ali Ibn Yusuf al-Fasi (1599–1680).

Notes

Books by al-Fasi
Hawashi ala Kalam, Fez 1899
Ibtihaj al-qulub bi khabar al-Shaykh Abi al-Mahasin wa wa shaykhihi al-Majdhub (a biography of Abu l-Mahasin Yusuf al-Fasi and other Moroccan sheikhs)
Sharh al' Amal al-Fasi  (treatise on law), lithography, Fes, ed. Al-Matba'a al Maghribiya, 1899
Bu Şinaq, translated by Nicolae Dobrişan, ANA, 2nd  vol., p. 128–134.
al-Djumu fi ilm al-musiqi wa'l tubul (The gatherings in the theory of music and the musical modes)

References
 Al-Kattani, Salwat al-Anfas I, 32
 "Al-Lamiya de az-Zaqqaq, al-'Amal al-Fasi de 'Abd ar-Rahman al-Fasi, y al-'Amal al-Mutlaq de as-Siyilmasi" by Henry Toledano, International Journal of Middle East Studies, vol. 5, 1974.
Brockelmann, GAL SII, p. 694
Levi Provençal, Chorfa 266
John Ralph Willis, In the path of Allah: the passion of al-Hajj Umar, p. 225

See also
Mohammed al-Qasim al-Sijilmasi

Moroccan writers
17th-century Moroccan historians
Moroccan Maliki scholars
1631 births
1685 deaths
People from Fez, Morocco
Moroccan astronomers
Moroccan musicians